A fishing video game is a video game genre in which the player fishes.  Usually they take the form of fishing tournaments. Many feature a wide variety of locations in which to fish, fish to catch, and fishing paraphernalia such as fishing rods, lures, and boats. Gameplay usually revolves around reacting quickly to an on-screen trigger that the bait was taken, along with some sort of button press sequence to reel the fish in.

Though not as prolific as other video games genres, fishing video games have historically been popular.

History
Fishing Derby (1980) by David Crane for the Atari 2600, is an early example of the genre.

"Fish games" also refers to a type of arcade redemption game involving shooting fish. These game first appeared around 2005 in China. These games also become popular in the United States in the mid 2010s, starting in the Pacific rim before spreading in popularity. The legal status of these games has been disputed in many countries and states due to gambling issues, and association with organized crime.

Fishing minigames
Minigames of fishing are also common inside larger action-adventure games. The Legend of Zelda series is particularly famous for having a fishing minigame in The Legend of Zelda: Ocarina of Time and The Legend of Zelda: Twilight PrincessOpen world games usually includes fishing mechanics. This is specially common in simulation videogames, where fishing is required to complete collections, fulfill missions, and obtaining crafting ingredients.

References

Fishing video games